Sony α 200 (DSLR-A200) is the third model of Sony α digital cameras. The model offers a slight upgrade from the Sony α 100 at a lower price. It first shipped in February 2008.

It was officially succeeded by the Sony α 230; the α 230 is much lighter, also several features have been removed and direct buttons to several options have been replaced with on-screen menus. Many Alpha enthusiasts believe that the true replacement for the α 200 is the α 450 as it is more similar in size and weight, features and target market.

Major changes from the α 100
Some of the major changes from the previous A100 model are:
LCD monitor upgrade from 2.5-inch to 2.7-inch, but same effective pixels
X-sync (With Super Steady Shot On) from 1/125s to 1/160s
More Recording Formats (16:9 selectable)
New vertical grip VG-B30AM
Higher ISO Sensitivity from 1600 to 3200
Improved: Noise Handling
Improved: AF Algorithm
Changed: Button Layout - Second Function wheel has been replaced
Removed: 2s Mirror Lockup
Removed: Depth of Field preview Button
Removed: Included MemoryStick to CF adapter (was included with Alpha 100)
Removed: Flash/Hot Shoe cover

External links

Specification in Sony.com
Specification in Sony UK

200
Digital cameras with CCD image sensor